"River"  is a song by British singer-songwriter Bishop Briggs, released on 22 January 2016 through Teleport Records and Island Records. Initially, it was released on the artist's SoundCloud. It is the second single released on Briggs's debut album Church of Scars.

The song became a hit and reached top 10 on three different Billboard charts as well as number one on the Spotify US Viral 50.

Background
The song is about a strained relationship that is on the edge of failure. Bishop Briggs stated that the lyrics of the song “was all about the tension…My hope with that song is it makes people feel empowered [to] take things into their own hands. I always have the visual, especially when I was writing it, to go up to someone's face and egg them on, and ask them to push you to your limits. I think there is something strong and exciting about that."

Composition

The song starts with "a whipping percussion", before it "transitions into an explosive chorus highlighting Briggs's fierce, soulful-rocker vocals". Vice felt that the song was "seemingly birthed by witches off the Bayou, bearing handclaps like reddening thigh slaps and boasting a topline that allows Bishop to truly exercise her range."

Music video
The music video was directed by Jungle George. Bishop Briggs stated the video was "about embracing my inner demons and setting them loose." It begins with an opening shot of Bishop Briggs sinking in water. In the video, there is a scene where she convulses and another where she is wearing a bag over her head.

Critical reception
Brooklyn Magazine wrote it is “an explosive track with the potential to be a massive radio hit. It will leave you feeling empowered with surging bass and skyward vocals.” Antonio Beliveau in Life & News wrote, “Simple. Space. Repetition. Straight to the point… It’s not a song that goes into my iTunes after hearing it even for the third time. But there’s a lot to appreciate about this cut.” Hooligan Magazine wrote, “Parts of this track suck the air right out of the room, but Briggs never fails to throw us right back into the mix with her smooth guitar playing and slick voice. “River” has something for everybody.”

Live performances
In her television debut, Bishop Briggs performed the song on The Tonight Show Starring Jimmy Fallon on August 1, 2016.

Cover versions
In live shows starting in 2017, Pink has frequently covered "River." She did so on some stops of her 2018–2019 Beautiful Trauma World Tour, including on her live album All I Know So Far: Setlist.

Charts
}

Weekly charts

Year-end charts

Certifications

References

2016 singles
2016 songs
Island Records singles
Songs about rivers